Terence Jay (born 1985 in New Jersey, USA) is an American actor and musician. He is best known for his role as Jeremy Van Holden in the 2005 film Green Street, playing alongside Elijah Wood, and for writing and performing several songs on the film's soundtrack, including the one played during the film's final sequence, "One Blood". He also played as Zane in the 2007 supernatural horror film Buried Alive in which he is shown playing the guitar and singing.
In 2016 Terence Jay formed the company Nirvana Handpan, a business that fabricates custom steel musical instruments called Handpans. His current work can be seen and heard at www.NirvanaHandpan.com

Terence Jay is producer Deborah Del Prete's son.

Filmography

See also

Deborah Del Prete

External links 

1985 births
Living people
American male film actors
American male songwriters
Male actors from New Jersey